Once in Trubchevsk is a 2019 Russian drama film directed by Larisa Sadilova. It was screened in the Un Certain Regard section at the 2019 Cannes Film Festival.

References

External links
 

2019 films
2019 drama films
Russian drama films
2010s Russian-language films
Films directed by Larisa Sadilova